Kumbakonam Degree Coffee is a type of coffee from Kumbakonam, in the  Thanjavur District of the state of Tamil Nadu, India. Its speciality is the use of cows' milk without any adulterants.

References 

Coffee brands
Kumbakonam
Economy of Tamil Nadu
Indian brands
Coffee in India